Yannik Oenning (born February 22, 1993) is a German footballer who currently plays for SV Wehen Wiesbaden.

External links

1993 births
Living people
German footballers
SV Wehen Wiesbaden players
3. Liga players
Association football fullbacks
People from Bocholt, Germany
Sportspeople from Münster (region)
Footballers from North Rhine-Westphalia